Charlat Island is a small island lying immediately west of the south end of Petermann Island, in the Wilhelm Archipelago. It was discovered by the French Antarctic Expedition, 1908–10, and named by Jean-Baptiste Charcot for Monsieur Charlat, then French Vice-Consul in Rio de Janeiro.

See also 
 List of Antarctic and sub-Antarctic islands

References
 

Islands of the Wilhelm Archipelago